The  (GBA) is a 32-bit handheld game console developed, manufactured and marketed by Nintendo as the successor to the Game Boy Color. It was released in Japan on March 21, 2001, in North America on June 11, 2001, in the PAL region on June 22, 2001, and in mainland China as iQue Game Boy Advance on June 8, 2004. The GBA is part of the sixth generation of video game consoles. The original model does not have an illuminated screen; Nintendo addressed that with the release of a redesigned model with a frontlit screen, the Game Boy Advance SP, in 2003. A newer revision of the redesign was released in 2005, with a backlit screen. Around the same time, the final redesign, the Game Boy Micro, was released in September 2005.

As of June 2010, 81.51 million units of the Game Boy Advance series have been sold worldwide. Its successor, the Nintendo DS, was released in November 2004 and is backward compatible with Game Boy Advance software.

History
Contrary to the Game Boy and Game Boy color, which have the "portrait" form factor (designed by Gunpei Yokoi), the Game Boy Advance was designed in a "landscape" form factor, putting the buttons to the sides of the device instead of below the screen. It was designed by the French designer Gwénaël Nicolas and his Tokyo-based design studio Curiosity Inc.

News of a successor to the Game Boy Color (GBC) first emerged at the Nintendo Space World trade show in late August 1999, where it was reported that two new handheld systems were in development. An improved version of the GBC with wireless online connectivity was codenamed the Advanced Game Boy (AGB), and a brand-new 32-bit system was not set for release until the following year. On September 1, 1999, Nintendo officially announced the Game Boy Advance, revealing details about the system's specifications including online connectivity through a cellular device and an improved model of the Game Boy Camera. Nintendo teased that the handheld would first be released in Japan in August 2000, with the North American and European launch dates slated for the end of the same year. Simultaneously, Nintendo announced a partnership with Konami to form Mobile 21, a development studio that would focus on creating technology for the GBA to interact with the GameCube, Nintendo's home console which was also in development at the time under the name "Dolphin". On August 21, 2000, IGN showed off images of a GBA development kit running a demonstrational port of Yoshi Story, and on August 22, pre-production images of the GBA were revealed in an issue of Famitsu magazine in Japan. On August 24, Nintendo officially revealed the console to the public in a presentation, revealing the Japanese and North American launch dates, in addition to revealing that 10 games would be available as launch games for the system. The GBA was then featured at Nintendo Space World 2000 from August 24 to 26 alongside several peripherals for the system, including the GBA Link cable, the GameCube - Game Boy Advance link cable, a rechargeable battery pack for the system, and an infrared communications adaptor which would allow systems to exchange data. In March 2001, Nintendo revealed details about the system's North American launch, including the suggested price of $99.99 and the 15 launch games. Nintendo estimated that around 60 new games would be made available for the system by the end of 2001.

Project Atlantis
In 1996, magazines including Electronic Gaming Monthly, Next Generation, issues 53 and 54 of Total!, and the July 1996 issue of Game Informer featured reports of a successor to the original Game Boy, codenamed Project Atlantis. Although Nintendo's expectations of releasing the system in at least one territory by the end of 1996 would make that machine seem to be the Game Boy Color, it was described as having a 32-bit ARM processor, a 3-by-2-inch (7.6 cm x 5 cm) color screen, and a link port — a description that more closely matches the Game Boy Advance. Electronic Gaming Monthly reported the processor to be an ARM710, clocked at 25 MHz, while Next Generation claimed it to be a StrongARM SA-110, possibly supporting 160 MHz. Both were designed by Advanced RISC Machines (ARM), which also created the CPU for the Game Boy Advance (and all Nintendo handhelds up to the Nintendo Switch). In terms of software, it was announced that Nintendo of Japan was working on a game for the system called Mario's Castle, ultimately unreleased. Nintendo suspended the Atlantis project sometime in 1997, since the original Game Boy's 80% of the handheld market share was considered too high to merit the release of a successor.

During a panel discussion at 2009's Game Developers Conference, a cancelled "Game Boy Advance predecessor" was shown on-screen, which looked like a bulky Game Boy Color. While not named, Joystiq concluded this device was most likely Project Atlantis.

Hardware

Technical specifications
The technical specifications of the original Game Boy Advance are, as provided by Nintendo:

Backward compatibility for Game Boy and Game Boy Color games is provided by a custom 4.194/8.388 MHz hybrid Z80 & 8080-based coprocessor (Game Boy Advance software can use the audio tone generators to supplement the primary sound system), while a link port at the top of the unit allows it to be connected to other devices using a Game Link cable or GameCube link cable. When playing Game Boy or Game Boy Color games on the Game Boy Advance, the L and R buttons can be used to toggle between a stretched widescreen format  and the original screen ratio of the Game Boy . Game Boy games can be played using the same selectable color palettes as on the Game Boy Color. Every Nintendo handheld system following the release of the Game Boy Advance SP has included a built-in light and rechargeable battery.

The Game Boy Advance 2D graphics hardware has scaling and rotation for traditional tiled backgrounds in its modes 1 and 2 and scaling and rotation for bitmaps in modes 3 through 5 (used less often on the GBA because of technical limitations). On each machine supporting this effect, it is possible to change the scaling and rotation values during the horizontal blanking period of each scanline to draw a flat plane in a perspective projection. More complex effects such as fuzz are possible by using other equations for the position, scaling, and rotation of each line. The "character mode" supports up to 4 tile map background layers per frame, with each tile being 8x8 pixels in size and having 16 or 256 colors. The "character mode" also supports up to 128 hardware sprites per frame, with any sprite size from 8x8 to 64x64 pixels and with 16 or 256 colors per sprite.

Color variants
The Game Boy Advance has been available in numerous colors and limited editions throughout its production. It was initially available in Arctic, Black, Orange, Fuchsia (translucent pink), Glacier (translucent blue/purple), and Indigo. Later in the system's availability, additional colors and special editions were released, including: Red, Clear Orange/Black, Platinum, White, Gold, Hello Kitty edition (pink with Hello Kitty and logo on bezel), The King of Fighters edition (black with images on bezel and buttons), Chobits edition (translucent light blue, with images on bezel and buttons), Battle Network Rockman EXE 2 (light blue with images on bezel), Mario Bros. edition (Glacier with Mario and Luigi on bezel), and Yomiuri Giants edition (Glacier with images on bezel).

A number of Pokémon-themed limited-edition systems were made available in Pokémon Center stores in Japan. These editions include: Gold Pokémon edition (Gold with Pikachu and Pichu on bezel), Suicune edition (blue/grey with greyscale Pikachu and Pichu on bezel, and a Pokémon Center sticker on the back), Celebi edition (olive green with Celebi images on bezel), and Latias/Latios edition (pink/red and purple, with images of Latias and Latios on bezel).

Games

With hardware performance comparable to the Super Nintendo Entertainment System, the Game Boy Advance represents progress for sprite-based technology. The system's library includes platformers, SNES-like role-playing video games, and games ported from various 8-bit and 16-bit systems of the previous generations. This includes the Super Mario Advance series, as well as the system's backward compatibility with all earlier Game Boy titles. While most GBA games employ 2D graphics, developers have ambitiously designed some 3D GBA games that push the limits of the hardware, including first-person shooters like a port of Doom, racing games like V-Rally 3, and even platformers, like Asterix & Obelix XXL.

Some cartridges are colored to resemble the game (usually for the Pokémon series; Pokémon Emerald, for example, being a clear emerald green). They are also compatible with Nintendo DS and DS Lite (but see the Compatibility with other systems section for limitations). Some GBA cartridges have built-in features, including rumble features (Drill Dozer), tilt sensors (WarioWare: Twisted!, Yoshi's Universal Gravitation) and solar sensors (Boktai).

In Japan, the final game to have been released on the system is Final Fantasy VI Advance on November 30, 2006, which is also the final game published by Nintendo on the system. In North America, the last game for the system is Samurai Deeper Kyo, released on February 12, 2008. Lastly, in Europe, 2 Games in 1: Columns Crown & ChuChu Rocket! is the last game for the system (and also the last one released on the system overall), released on November 28, 2008. The Japan-only Rhythm Tengoku, the first game in what would eventually become known outside Japan as the Rhythm Heaven/Rhythm Paradise series, is the final first-party-developed game for the system, released on August 3, 2006.

Launch games

Compatibility with other systems

An accessory for the GameCube, known as the Game Boy Player, was released in 2003 as the successor to the Super Game Boy peripheral for the Super Nintendo Entertainment System. The accessory allows Game Boy Advance games, as well as Game Boy and Game Boy Color games, to be played on the GameCube. However, some games may have compatibility issues due to certain features requiring extra hardware. For example, games with built-in motion sensors (such as Yoshi's Topsy-Turvy) would require players to manipulate the console itself.

The GBA is the last of the three Nintendo handheld systems to bear the Game Boy name. Games developed for it are incompatible with older Game Boy systems, and each game's box carries a label indicating that the game is "not compatible with other Game Boy systems". However, games designed for older Game Boy systems are conversely compatible with the Game Boy Advance, with options to play such games on either their standard aspect ratios or a stretched fullscreen.

Game Boy Advance games are compatible with Nintendo DS models that support them with a dedicated GBA cartridge slot beneath the touch screen (specifically the original model and the Nintendo DS Lite), although they do not support multiplayer or features involving the use of GBA accessories because they do not have the GBA's external peripheral port that these features require to function. The Nintendo DSi and Nintendo DSi XL do not have backward compatibility with the GBA and a few DS games that use the GBA slot.

Virtual Console

As part of an Ambassador Program for early adopters of the Nintendo 3DS system, ten Game Boy Advance games, along with ten Nintendo Entertainment System games, were made available free for players who bought a system before the price drop on August 12, 2011.<ref name="Pricedrop">{{cite press release |url=https://www.businesswire.com/news/home/20110728005623/en/Nintendo-3DS-Price-Drops-to-169.99-as-Great-Value-and-New-3D-Games-Come-Together |title=Nintendo 3DS Price Drops to $169.99, as Great Value and New 3D Games Come Together |date=July 28, 2011 |publisher=Nintendo of America |access-date=May 18, 2022 |quote=By the end of 2011, Nintendo will provide Ambassadors with 10 Game Boy Advance Virtual Console games. These include games like Yoshi's Island: Super Mario Advance 3, Mario Kart: Super Circuit, Metroid Fusion, WarioWare, Inc.: Mega Microgame$, and Mario vs. Donkey Kong. These games were made available to Ambassadors, and Nintendo has no plans to make these 10 games available to the general public on the Nintendo 3DS in the future. |archive-date=May 18, 2022 |archive-url=https://web.archive.org/web/20220518192933/https://www.businesswire.com/news/home/20110728005623/en/Nintendo-3DS-Price-Drops-to-169.99-as-Great-Value-and-New-3D-Games-Come-Together |url-status=live }}</ref> Unlike the other Virtual Console games for the system, features such as the Home menu or save states are missing, since the games are running natively instead of in emulation. 3DS systems that have custom firmware installed can also install the ten available games available to Ambassador Program members. Many other Game Boy Advance games can also be played via custom firmware by injecting a different game into one of the released Game Boy Advance games. Satoru Iwata stated Game Boy Advance games will be available on the Wii U's Virtual Console sometime during April 2014. On April 3, 2014, the first of the announced GBA games, Advance Wars, Metroid Fusion, and Mario & Luigi: Superstar Saga, were released for the Wii U's Virtual Console. A Virtual Console library of Game Boy Advance games was launched for the Wii U console. Similar to the original DS and DS Lite, all of the Virtual Console releases are single-player only, as they do not emulate multiplayer features enabled by Game Link cables.

Accessories
Official

Nintendo released various addons for the Game Boy Advance, which include:
 Wireless Adapter: Released in 2004, this adapter hooks up to the back of the Game Boy Advance. It replaces link cables and allows many people to link together. It was marketed for US$20 and came included with Pokémon FireRed and LeafGreen. Because it was released so late in the Game Boy Advance's life, fewer than 20 games support this hardware. The adapter's usefulness is most evident in Pokémon, as FireRed/LeafGreen and Emerald feature a "Union Room" where up to forty people can enter to battle or trade Pokémon. A Game Boy Micro version was released interacting fully with both models of the Wireless Adapter.
 Game Boy Advance Infra-Red Adapter: This adapter was included with the game Cyberdrive Zoids, as it is only compatible with this game. The adapter was not sold separately. This is also currently the only Game Boy Advance accessory that has not been remade for the Game Boy Micro.
 Nintendo GameCube – Game Boy Advance link cable: The link cable is used to connect the Game Boy Advance to the GameCube for interoperability between corresponding games. There are not many compatible games; notable games are Final Fantasy Crystal Chronicles, Pac-Man Vs., and The Legend of Zelda: Four Swords Adventures, allowing up to 4 players to use their Advance or SP handheld as a controller that has additional information on the screen, as well as The Legend of Zelda: The Wind Waker, allowing additional content to be unlocked through Tingle, one of the characters in the game. When using the cable in the game "Animal Crossing", players would be greeted by the in-game character Kapp'n at the dock who would transport them to a previously inaccessible island. The device works for Pokémon Colosseum and Pokémon XD which lets you trade Pokémon back and forth to its GBA iterations (Pokémon FireRed, LeafGreen, Ruby, Sapphire, and Emerald), also allowing you to transfer Jirachi to Pokémon Ruby and Sapphire using the Pokémon Colosseum Bonus Disc. In addition, it can be used to transfer Chao between Sonic Adventure 2: Battle, Sonic Adventure DX Director's Cut, Sonic Advance, and Sonic Advance 2. Finally, it can be used to unlock the "Fusion" skin for Samus (that was introduced in Metroid Fusion) for use in Metroid Prime, provided that the player has also met certain conditions in both Fusion and Prime.
 Play-Yan: The Play-Yan is an MP3/MPEG4 player for the Game Boy Advance and Nintendo DS. The cartridge is slightly broader than a normal Game Boy Advance cartridge and includes a built-in headphone port as well as an SD Card slot. Music or videos that users have downloaded from the Internet can be transferred onto an SD Card and slotted into the Play-Yan device. Nintendo has released several mini-games for the Play-Yan that can be downloaded from their website, although Nintendo later removed all minigame functionality through a firmware update. The Play-Yan was initially available in Japan only but was released in Europe as the Nintendo MP3 Player on December 8, 2006, with the MPEG4 functionality removed. The Play-Yan was never released in North America.
 e-Reader: The e-Reader is a scanning device that plugs into the game cartridge slot of the Game Boy Advance. Specialized cards with codes along the side and bottom are slid through the slot, scanning the card into the Game Boy Advance. Many ideas for the e-Reader include cards that scan classic games like Donkey Kong and Excitebike onto the handheld ready to play, as well as a collaboration with Super Mario Advance 4 and Pokémon Ruby and Sapphire to have cards that unlock the content. GameCube games like Animal Crossing have cards with unlockable content as well, and the Pokémon Trading Card Game playing cards also adopt the e-Reader codes. The e-Reader works with the Game Boy Player and Game Boy Advance SP, but cannot fit into the Nintendo DS's Game Boy slot (however it can fit into the Nintendo DS Lite's Game Boy slot). Though it failed to catch on in the US, it proved to be very popular in Japan. It was not released in Europe.
 Game Boy Advance Video: These cartridges contain two episodes of thirty-minute cartoon programs. First released in North America in May 2004, these cartridges included cartoons such as Dragon Ball GT, Pokémon, SpongeBob SquarePants, Sonic X, Teenage Mutant Ninja Turtles, and Yu-Gi-Oh!. The movies Shrek, Shrek 2, and Shark Tale are also available for Game Boy Advance Video and all three are full movies. Due to the Game Boy Advance screen ratio, the three movies are in their widescreen format. These cartridges display an error when inserted into a GameCube via a Game Boy Player, to prevent users from attempting to record the episodes onto VHS tapes.
 Cleaning cartridge: A white cartridge that has a soft cloth inside so that it cleans the connectors of the Game Boy Advance when inserted. It can also be used to clean Slot 2 of the Nintendo DS or DS Lite.
 Mobile Adapter: The device works with Game Boy and Game Boy Advance systems to connect to mobile phones for remote play. It was released in Japan and was compatible with Pokémon Crystal''.

Unofficial

Other accessories for the Game Boy Advance include:
 Afterburner: The Afterburner is an internal front-lighting system manufactured by Triton Labs and released in mid-2002. The installation consists of disassembling the system, removing some plastic from the interior of the case, attaching the lighting mechanism to the screen, and soldering two wires to the motherboard for power. Optionally, a potentiometer or an integrated circuit could be added to allow adjusting the brightness of the light. When the initial version of the Game Boy Advance SP was released, it included a very similar integrated lighting system. This was replaced in the subsequent version of the Game Boy Advance SP with a backlit display. According to Triton Labs, the Afterburner achieved considerable success during the lifespan of the GBA, with many gamers buying it though the kit voids the system's warranty, and the company had minor trouble keeping up with demand for the accessory during the 2002 holiday season.
 WormCam: This device by Nyko attaches to the top of the Game Boy Advance and connects to the link port of the GBA. This device functions as a digital camera which allows digital pictures to be taken. The snapshots can then be uploaded to a computer with the USB cable and software provided. This camera's strange shape prevents it from being used with the GBA SP.
 Glucoboy: This is a blood glucose monitor with built-in games released in Australia in 2007 for children with diabetes.

Revisions

Game Boy Advance SP

In early 2003, Nintendo introduced a new form-factor for the handheld, known as the Game Boy Advance SP (model AGS-001). The redesigned unit resembles a pocket-size laptop computer, including a folding case approximately one-half the size of the original unit. It also supports a rechargeable lithium-ion battery, a significantly brighter LCD screen, and an internal front-light that can be toggled on and off. The redesign was intended to address some common complaints about the original Game Boy Advance, which had been criticized for being somewhat uncomfortable to use, especially due to a dark screen.

Backlight model (AGS-101)

Around the same time as the release of the Game Boy Micro, Nintendo released a new backlit version of the SP (model AGS-101). The switch that controls the light now toggles between "normal" (which itself is already brighter than the original Game Boy Advance SP's screen), and "bright", an intense brightness level similar to an LCD television.

Game Boy Micro

In September 2005, Nintendo released a second redesign of the Game Boy Advance. This model, dubbed the Game Boy Micro, is similar in style to the original Game Boy Advance's horizontal orientation, but is much smaller and sleeker. The Game Boy Micro also allows the user to switch between several colored faceplates to allow customization, a feature which Nintendo advertised heavily around the Game Boy Micro's launch. Nintendo also hoped that this "fashion" feature would help target audiences outside of typical video game players. Unlike the previous Game Boy Advance models, the Game Boy Micro is unable to support Game Boy and Game Boy Color titles. The Game Boy Micro did not make much of an impact in the video game market, as it was overshadowed by Nintendo's more powerful portable, the Nintendo DS, which also played Game Boy Advance games through the GBA cartridge slot.

Reception
Upon its North American release, IGN praised the Game Boy Advance's graphical capabilities and battery life, but criticized the system's shoulder button placement and noted the system's high price tag which "may be a tad bit too high to swallow," ultimately scoring the system with an "8.0" out of 10. They also pointed out the system's lack of a backlight which occasionally got in the way of playing games.
ABC News praised the Game Boy Advance's graphics, grip and larger screen, stating that "You've never had as much fun playing old games."

Reviewing for CNET, Darren Gladstone scored the system with a 7.0 out of 10, praising its graphical performance and backwards compatibility, but being considerably critical of the system's lack of a backlit screen, noting that it makes it "nearly impossible" to play in normal lighting conditions. Gladstone ultimately suggested the sleeker and backlit Game Boy Advance SP over the system despite noting that its cheaper price may "appeal to gamers on a lower budget."
Despite ending support in 2010, ROM hacks, fan games, and Homebrew games are still being developed by indie communities for the GBA.

Sales
Nintendo hoped to sell 1.1 million Game Boy Advance units by the end of March with the system's Japanese debut, and anticipated sales of 24 million units before the end of 2001; many marketing analysts believed for this to be a realistic goal due to the company's lack of major competition in the handheld video game market. Within the first week of its North American launch in June, the Game Boy Advance sold 500,000 units, making it the fastest-selling video game console in the United States at the time. In response to strong sales, Nintendo ordered 100,000 units to ship to retail stores, hoping to ship another half million of them by the end of June. The Game Boy Advance also became the fastest-selling system in the United Kingdom, selling 81,000 units in its first week of release and beating the PlayStation 2's previous record of 20,000 units. In 2004, the system's sales in the United Kingdom surpassed one million units.

On December 1, 2006, Nintendo of America released launch-to-date information indicating that the company had sold 33.6 million units of the Game Boy Advance series in the United States. In a Kotaku article published on January 18, 2008, Nintendo revealed that the Game Boy Advance series had sold 36.2 million units in the United States, as of January 1, 2008. As of December 31, 2009, the Game Boy Advance series has sold 81.51 million units worldwide, 43.57 million of which are Game Boy Advance SP units and 2.42 million of which are Game Boy Micro units.

After the Game Boy Advance's discontinuation, the most popular software became mostly games oriented to younger gamers.

See also
 Visteon Dockable Entertainment

Notes

References

External links

 Official website (archived)
 Game Boy Advance at Nintendo.com (archived versions at the Internet Archive Wayback Machine)
 

 
2000s toys
Backward-compatible video game consoles
Discontinued handheld game consoles
Game Boy consoles
Handheld game consoles
IQue consoles
Products introduced in 2001
Products and services discontinued in 2010
Regionless game consoles
Sixth-generation video game consoles